Xinshi is a township of Qu County in northeastern Sichuan province, China, located about  west of the county seat. , it has one residential community and six villages under its administration.

References 

Township-level divisions of Sichuan